The Pleasant Hill Historical Society Museum is a public museum and research library located at 125 Wyoming St. in Pleasant Hill, Missouri. It features a collection of 8,000 indexed photographs dating back to the late 1880s, artifacts, and historical and genealogical resources from Pleasant Hill. The museum is not funded by the city of Pleasant Hill; its primary fundraiser is Railroad Days, which takes place annually in April.

The museum's facade includes elements of historic local buildings. The historical society and museum was a contributor to the development of the nomination for National Register of Historic Places listing of the Pleasant Hill Downtown Historic District.

References

Museums in Pleasant Hill, Missouri
History museums in Missouri
Tourist attractions in Pleasant Hill, Missouri